One of the six S-train radial lines in Copenhagen runs along the long-distance tracks on Vestbanen (the railway towards Roskilde and beyond) and provides local train service on its inner parts. The S-trains end at Høje Taastrup about 20 km west of the city centre.

Stations

Service patterns
The principal service is B which stops at all stations. In the rush hours it is supplemented with express trains on service Bx.

History
The railway from Copenhagen to Roskilde was opened in 1847 as the first railway in Denmark. The Copenhagen terminus was moved in 1864 and the approaches inside the current Hvidovre station were moved. In 1911 the central station moved back almost to its original site, and the old alignment was reinstated.

In 1934 one of the three main tracks between København H and Valby was electrified for S-trains. A second S-train track was also built between København H and just before Enghave; between those two tracks was the maintenance depot for S-train until the current depot at Taastrup opened in 1968.

The single S-train track from Enghave to Valby was doubled in 1941, at the same time as the S-train line was extended to Vanløse (on the Frederikssund radial). In 1953 new S-train tracks north of the main line were opened as far as Glostrup. It was originally single-tracked outside Hvidovre, but a second track was added in 1963 shortly before the S-train line was extended to Tåstrup.

For many years the S-trains ended in Tåstrup, and most regional trains on the mainline stopped at Tåstrup to provide transfers to the S-trains. In 1986 this transfer function moved to the new Høje Taastrup station a few kilometers west of Tåstrup. The Høje Taastrup station was built on open land that was planned to become a minor regional center, and was envisaged as a relief station for the central København H. Thus all long-distance trains going west from Copenhagen stop there. The area around the station has become more built-up since its opening, but the grand plans to let it become a "second city center" have not quite been reached.

Around 2000 plans to extend the S-train service beyond Høje Tåstrup to Roskilde reached a fairly advanced stage before finally being dropped in May 2002. In  such plans are still occasionally being discussed politically.

S-train (Copenhagen) lines